The Latin Grammy Award for Best Tropical Fusion Album is an award presented at the Latin Grammy Awards beginning in 2012, a ceremony that recognizes excellence and creates a wider awareness of cultural diversity and contributions of Latin recording artists in the United States and internationally. The award went to solo artists, duos, or groups for releasing vocal or instrumental albums containing at least 51% of new recordings. The award first presented to Colombian singer Fonseca for the album Ilusión+ at the 13th Latin Grammy Awards ceremony in 2012. In 2014, the accolade was combined with Latin Grammy Award for Best Contemporary Tropical Album.

Winners and nominees

2010s

See also 
Grammy Award for Best Tropical Latin Album
Latin Grammy Award for Best Cumbia/Vallenato Album
Latin Grammy Award for Best Traditional Tropical Album
Latin Grammy Award for Best Tropical Song

References 
General

  Note: User must select the "Tropical Field" category as the genre under the search feature.

Specific

External links
Official site of the Latin Grammy Awards

 
Tropical Fusion Album
Tropical music albums
Tropical Fusion
Tropical Fusion
Awards established in 2012